Pangaea is a live album by American jazz trumpeter, composer, and bandleader Miles Davis. It was originally released as a double album in 1976 by CBS Sony in Japan.

Recorded during Davis' electric period, the album captures the second of two concerts he performed on February 1, 1975, at Osaka's Festival Hall. As with the first concert (captured on the 1975 album Agharta), Davis led a band featuring guitarists Pete Cosey and Reggie Lucas, saxophonist Sonny Fortune, bassist Michael Henderson, drummer Al Foster, and percussionist James Mtume.

Composition and performance 
Both Pangaea and its predecessor Agharta were recorded on February 1, 1975, in Osaka, Japan, at the Festival Hall. The Agharta concert took place during an afternoon matinee, whereas Pangaea was recorded in the evening. This album's music was split into two tracks, "Zimbabwe" and "Gondwana", the latter of which was the name of the ancient supercontinent, as was "Pangaea". According to discographer Peter Losin, the first track contains performances of "Turnaroundphrase", "Tune in 5", "Turnaroundphrase" again, "Tune in 5" again and "Zimbabwe" (not to be confused with the actual medley recording's title). The second track contains performances of "Ife", and "For Dave (Mr. Foster)", performed in that order.

Release 
The album was first released exclusively in Japan by CBS Sony in 1976. It did not see release anywhere else until 1991, when in May that year, Columbia Records released Pangaea on CD in the United States, as part of the label's Columbia Jazz Contemporary Masters reissue program.

Critical reception 

In The Village Voice, Robert Christgau gave Pangaeas 1991 CD reissue an honorable mention, citing "Zimbabwe" as the highlight while lamenting the flute playing and scant track listing. Davis biographer Jack Chambers found the performance "vastly" inferior to Agharta, as did Paul Tingen, who lamented Davis' reduced presence and role directing his band. Tingen also observed "a sense of tiredness and drift", which he attributed to the septet having played the first concert earlier that day: "There are several extended periods during which the band just plays out the grooves, waiting for Miles to give the next cue." In the Los Angeles Times, Bill Kohlhaase called Pangaea "a striking personal soundtrack of decline that, like Miles himself, suffers from exhaustion before playing itself out".

AllMusic's Thom Jurek was more enthusiastic. Although he found the band less impressive here than on Agharta, Jurek said some individual members stood out more on Pangaea, which he found just "as relentless" and "plenty satisfying". J. D. Considine rated it half-a-star higher than Agharta in The Rolling Stone Album Guide. In The Penguin Guide to Jazz, Richard Cook and Brian Morton wrote that like its predecessor, Pangaeas lengthy performances combined musical forms from African-American genres with Karlheinz Stockhausen's "conception of a 'world music' that moves like creeping tectonic plates". Furthermore, Cook and Morton write that 'Miles's trumpet playing on these bruising, unconscionable records is of the highest and most adventurous order...' At the end of 1991, Pangaea was voted the ninth best reissue of the year in the Pazz & Jop, an annual poll of American critics published in The Village Voice.

Influence 
As with several other of Davis' live albums from the period, Pangaea became an influence on several no wave and funk artists. Highbrow new wave and punk rock musicians, including Tom Verlaine of Television and Robert Quine, were also influenced by the album after managing to obtain copies as an import from Japan.

Track listing

1976 LP

1991 CD

 "Gondwana" runs a length of 49:46 on the album's 1996 Japanese reissue.

Personnel

Musicians
Miles Davis – electric trumpet with wah-wah, organ
Sonny Fortune – soprano saxophone, alto saxophone, flute
Pete Cosey – electric guitar, synthesizer, percussion
Reggie Lucas – electric guitar
Michael Henderson – electric bass
Al Foster – drums
James "Mtume" Foreman – conga, percussion, water drum, rhythm box

Production
Producer – Teo Macero
Director – Keiichi Nakamura
Engineer – Tamoo Suzuki
Assistant Engineer – Mitsuru Kasai, Takaaki Amano
Package Coordination – Tony Tiller
Artwork –

References
Footnotes

Bibliography

External links 
 

Albums produced by Teo Macero
Miles Davis live albums
1976 live albums
Columbia Records live albums
Albums recorded at Festival Hall, Osaka